Arcola is an unincorporated community and coal town in Webster County, West Virginia, United States.

The name Arcola ("our coal") was selected by coal mining officials.

References 

Unincorporated communities in West Virginia
Unincorporated communities in Webster County, West Virginia
Coal towns in West Virginia